Bhubaneswar is the capital and largest city of the Indian state of Odisha. The region, especially the old town, was historically often depicted as Chakra Kshetra and Ekamra Kshetra (Area adorned with a mango tree). Bhubaneswar is dubbed the "Temple City", a nickname earned because of the 700 temples which once stood there. In contemporary times, it has emerged as an education hub and an attractive business destination.

Although the modern city of Bhubaneswar was formally established in 1948, the history of the areas in and around the present-day city can be traced to the 7th century BCE and earlier. It is a confluence of Hindu, Buddhist and Jain heritage and includes several Kalingan temples, many of them from 6th–13th century CE. With Puri and Konark it forms the 'Swarna Tribhuja' ("Golden Triangle"), one of Eastern India's most visited destinations.

Bhubaneswar replaced Cuttack as the capital on 19 August 1949, two years after India gained its independence from Britain. The modern city was designed by the German architect Otto Königsberger in 1946. Along with Jamshedpur and Chandigarh, it was one of modern India's first planned cities. Bhubaneswar and Cuttack are often referred to as the 'twin cities of Odisha'. The metropolitan area formed by the two cities had a population of 1.7 million in 2011. The Bhubaneswar metro area has a population of around a million people, and is categorised as a Tier-2 city. Bhubaneswar and Rourkela are the two cities in smart city mission from Odisha.

Etymology 
Bhubaneswar is the anglicisation of the actual Odia name "Bhubaneśwara"(ଭୁବନେଶ୍ୱର), derived from the word Tribhubaneśwara (ତ୍ରିଭୁବନେଶ୍ୱର), which literally means the Lord (Iśwara) of the Three Worlds (Tribhubana), which in this context refers to Shiva.

History 

Bhubaneswar stands near the ruins of Sisupalgarh, the ancient capital of the erstwhile province of Kalinga. Dhauli, near Bhubaneswar was the site of the Kalinga War (-261 BCE), in which the Mauryan emperor Ashoka invaded and annexed Kalinga. One of the most complete edicts of the Mauryan Emperor, Ashoka, dating from between 272 and 236 BCE, remains carved in rock,  to the southwest of the modern city. After the decline of the Mauryan empire, the area came under the rule of Mahameghavahana dynasty, whose most well-known ruler is Kharavela. His Hathigumpha inscription is located at the Udayagiri and Khandagiri Caves near Bhubaneswar. The area was subsequently ruled by several dynasties, including Satavahanas, Guptas, Matharas, and Shailodbhavas.

In the 7th century, Somavamshi or Keshari dynasty established their kingdom in the area, and constructed a number of temples. After the Kesharis, the Eastern Gangas ruled Kalinga area until the 14th century CE. Their capital Kalinganagara was located in present-day Bhubaneswar City. After them, Mukunda Deva of the Bhoi dynasty – the last Hindu ruler of the area until the Marathas – developed several religious buildings in the area. Most of the older temples in Bhubaneswar were built between 8th and 12th centuries, under Shaiva influence. The Ananta Vasudeva Temple is the only old temple of Vishnu in the city. In 1568, the Karrani dynasty of Afghan origin gained control of the area. During their reign, most of the temples and other structures were destroyed or disfigured.

In the 16th century, the area came under pachamani Mughal control. The Marathas, who succeeded the Mughals in the mid-18th century, encouraged pilgrimage in the region. In 1803, the area came under British colonial rule, and was part of the Bengal Presidency (until 1912), Bihar and Orissa Province (1912–1936) and Orissa Province (1936–1947). The capital of the British-ruled Orissa Province was Cuttack, which was vulnerabile to floods and suffered from space constraints. Because of this, on 30 September 1946, a proposal to move the capital to a new capital was introduced in the Legislative Assembly of the Odisha Province. After independence of India, the foundation of the new capital was laid by Prime Minister Jawaharlal Nehru on 13 April 1948.

The name of the new capital came from "Tribhubaneswara" or "Bhubaneswara" (literally "Lord of the Earth"), a name of Shiva, the deity of the Lingaraja temple. The Legislative Assembly of Odisha was shifted from Cuttack to Bhubaneswar in 1949. Bhubaneswar was built as a modern city, designed by German architect Otto Königsberger with wide roads, gardens and parks. Though part of the city followed the plan, it grew rapidly over the next few decades, outstripping the planning process. According to the first census of independent India, taken in 1951, the city's population was just 16,512. From 1952 to 1979, it was administered by a Notified Area Council or a nagar panchayat; a municipality was established only on 12 March 1979. By the 1991 census, the population of Bhubaneswar had increased to 411,542. Accordingly, on 14 August 1994, the Bhubaneswar Municipal Corporation was established.

Geography 

Bhubaneswar is in Khordha district of Odisha. It is in the eastern coastal plains, along the axis of the Eastern Ghats mountains. It lies southwest of the Mahanadi River that forms the northern boundary of Bhubaneswar metropolitan area, within its delta.

The city is bounded by the Daya River to the south and the Kuakhai River to the east; the Chandaka Wildlife Sanctuary and Nandankanan Zoo lie in the western and northern parts of Bhubaneswar, respectively.

Bhubaneswar is topographically divided into western uplands and eastern lowlands, with hillocks in the western and northern parts. Kanjia lake on the northern outskirts, affords rich biodiversity and is a wetland of national importance. Bhubaneswar's soils are 65 per cent laterite, 25 per cent alluvial and 10 per cent sandstone. The United Nations Development Programme reports that there is "very high damage risk" from winds and cyclones. The 1999 Odisha cyclone caused major damage to buildings, the city's infrastructure and cost many human lives. Floods and waterlogging in the low-lying areas have become common due to unplanned growth.

Urban structure 

The city is somewhat dumbbell-shaped with most of the growth taking place to the north, northeast and southwest. Growth in the east is restricted due to the presence of Kuakhai River and by the wildlife sanctuary in the northwestern part. The city can be broadly divided into the old town, planned city (or state capital), added areas and outer peripheral areas. It is subdivided into Units and Colonies.

The old town or "Temple Town", the oldest part of the city, is characterised by many temples, including the Lingaraja, Nilakantha Siva, Rajarani and Muktesvara temples, standing alongside residential areas. Additional structures include the Somabaresvara Siva Temple and the Kartikesvara Siva Temple. The area is congested, with narrow roads and poor infrastructure. Among neighbourhoods in the old town are Rajarani Colony, Pandaba Nagar, Brahmeswara Bagh, Lingaraja Nagar, Gouri Nagar, Bhimatangi and Kapileswara.

The planned city was designed in 1948 to house the capital. It is subdivided into units, each with a high school, shopping centres, dispensaries and play areas. While most of the units house government employees, Unit V houses the administrative buildings, including the State Secretariat, State Assembly and the Raj Bhavan. Private residential areas were later built in other areas of the planned city, including Saheed Nagar and Satya Nagar. Unit I, popularly known as the Market Building, was formed to cater to the shopping needs of the new capital's residents. Later, markets and commercial establishments developed along the Janpath and Cuttack-Puri Road at Saheed Nagar, Satya Nagar, Bapuji Nagar and Ashok Nagar. A dedicated institutional area houses educational and research institutes, including Utkal University, the Institute of Physics, the Institute of Minerals and Materials Technology and Sainik School. Indira Gandhi Park, Gandhi Park and the Biju Patnaik Park are located in the unit.

The added areas are mostly areas lying north of National Highway 5, including Nayapalli, Jayadev Vihar, Chandrasekharpur and Sailashree Vihar, Niladri vihar which were developed by Bhubaneswar Development Authority to house the growing population. With the development of the new areas such as Chandrasekharpur the city is now divided roughly into North(newer areas) and South Bhubaneswar (older areas) by the NH-5 highway.

The peripheral areas are outside the municipal boundary or have subsequently been included within the extended boundary, including Tomando, Patia and Raghunathpur. Most of these areas were developed in a haphazard manner, without proper planning. The Master Planning Branch of the Bhubaneswar Development Authority developed the Comprehensive Development Plan (CDP) in 2010. According to the Odisha Development Authorities Act, 1982, the Development Authority has control over the planning for municipal areas. Apart from the CDP, BDA has also created Zonal Development Plans for some of the areas under the CDP. Bhubaneswar secured the top rank in the Smart city list in India.

Climate 

Bhubaneswar has a tropical savanna climate, designated Aw under the Köppen climate classification. Summers (March to June) are hot and humid, with temperatures in the low 30s C; during dry spells, maximum temperatures often exceed  in May and June.

The highest monthly rainfall total, occurs in August.

Economy 

Bhubaneswar is an administrative, information technology, education and tourism city. Bhubaneswar was ranked as the best place to do business in India by the World Bank in 2014. Bhubaneswar has emerged as one of the fast-growing, important trading and commercial hub in the state and eastern India. Tourism is a major industry, attracting about 1.5 million tourists in 2011. Bhubaneswar was designed to be a largely residential city with outlying industrial areas. The economy had few major players until the 1990s and was dominated by retail and small-scale manufacturing. With the economic liberalisation policy adopted by the Government of India in the 1990s, Bhubaneswar received investment in telecommunications, information technology (IT) and higher education.

In 2011, according to a study by Associated Chambers of Commerce and Industry of India, Bhubaneswar had the highest rate of employment growth among 17 Tier-2 cities in India. It has been listed among the top ten emerging cities in India by Cushman and Wakefield, taking into consideration factors like demographics, physical, social and real estate infrastructure, current level and scope of economic activities and government support. In 2012, Bhubaneswar was ranked third among Indian cities, in starting and operating a business by the World Bank.
Bhubaneswar has been traditionally home to handicrafts industry, including silver filigree work, appliqué work, stone and wood carvings and patta painting, which significantly contributes to the city's economy. The late 2000s saw a surge of investments in the real estate, infrastructure, retail and hospitality sectors; several shopping malls and organised retails opened outlets in Bhubaneswar. In the informal sector, 22,000 vendors operate in regulated or unregulated vending zones.

As of 2001, around 2.15% of the city's workforce was employed in the primary sector (agriculture, forestry, mining, etc.); 2.18% worked in the secondary sector (industrial and manufacturing); and 95.67% worked in the tertiary sector (service industries).

The Department of Industries established four industrial areas in and around Bhubaneswar, in the Rasulgarh, Mancheswar, Chandaka, and Bhagabanpur areas. Industrial sector in Bhubaneswar includes paper, steel, automobile, food, pharma and electronics industries. A large number of companies including Odisha State Cooperative Milk Producers' Federation, Bharat Biotech, Topaz Solar, Britannia Industries, SMS Group and Jockey International have there manufacturing plant.

In 2009, Odisha was ranked ninth among Indian states in terms of software export by NASSCOM, with most IT/ITES companies established in Bhubaneswar. In 2011–12, Odisha had a growth rate of 17% for software exports. According to a 2012 survey, among the tier-2 cities in India, Bhubaneswar has been chosen as the best for conducting IT/ITES business. The government fostered growth by developing of IT parks such as Infocity-1, Infovalley, STPI-Bhubaneswar and JSS STP. Infocity was conceived as a five-star park, under the Export Promotion Industrial Parks (EPIP) Scheme to create infrastructure facilities for setting up information technology related industries. Infosys and Tech Mahindra have been present in Bhubaneswar since 1996. Other software companies, firms and Multinational Companies include Tata Consultancy Services, Wipro, IBM, Genpact, Firstsource, Mindtree, MphasiS, Ericsson, Semtech, Reliance Communications, PricewaterhouseCoopers , Bharti Airtel, DLF (company), Capgemini and Deloitte. It also houses the headquarters of POSCO India, a subsidiary of South Korean conglomerate POSCO and Govt. of India owned National Aluminium Company(NALCO). Apart from the big multinationals, some 300 small and mid-size IT companies and business startups have offices in Bhubaneswar.

Demographics

Population 

As per the 2011 census of India, Bhubaneswar had a population of 837,737, while the metropolitan area had a population of 881,988. , the number of males was 445,233, while the number of females were 392,504. The decadal growth rate was 45.90 per cent.

Literacy 
Effective male literacy was 95.69 per cent, while female literacy was 90.26 per cent. About 75,237 were under six. Bhubaneswar's literacy rate is 93.15 per cent—significantly higher than the national average of 74.04 per cent.

Language 
The main language spoken in the city is Odia. However, English and Hindi are understood by most residents. Although Odias comprise the vast majority, migrants from other states like Andhra Pradesh, Bihar, West Bengal, Rajasthan and Jharkhand also dwell in the city. Growth in the information technology industry and education sector in Bhubaneswar changed the city's demographic profile; likely infrastructure strains and haphazard growth from demographic changes have been a cause of concern.

Religion 

Bhubaneswar is a very religiously diverse city. Hindus form the majority in the city with more than 95% of the total population, as of 2011 Census of India. Muslims forms the second largest minority with 3.3% and Christians with 0.92%. There is also a significant minority population of Sikhs, Buddhists and Jains.

Governance and Politics

Civic Administration 
The Bhubaneswar Municipal Corporation (BMC) oversees and manages civic infrastructure for the city's 67 wards. It started as a Notified Area Committee in 1946 and was upgraded to a municipal corporation in 1994. Orissa Municipal Corporation Act, 2003 is the governing act. Residents of each ward elect a corporator to the BMC for a five-year term. Standing committees handle urban planning and maintain roads, government-aided schools, hospitals and municipal markets.

As Bhubaneswar's apex body, the corporation discharges its functions through the mayor-in-council, which comprises a mayor, a deputy mayor and other elected members. The executive wing is headed by a Commissioner. There are 13 administrative departments under BMC: PR & Communication, Disaster Management, Finance, Health & Sanitation, Engineering, Revenue & Tax, Electrical, Environment, Social Welfare, IT and Social Projects, Establishment, Land & Assets, Enforcement & Recovery. The responsibilities of the municipal body include drainage and sewerage, sanitation, solid waste management and street lighting.

The tenure of the last elected body ended in January 2019 and new elections have not taken place yet, because the High Court struck down the delimitation process that was carried out for exceeding 50% reservations of seats. Ward committees have been formed in Bhubaneswar and are very active. The Committees are responsible for issues such as public health, sanitation, street lighting and conservancy in their respective wards. There is no fixed number of members in the committees.

The processes for the municipal budget 2020–21 was initiated in February 2020, but it is unclear if they have continued after the lockdown was announced. The budget for 2020–21 was supposed to be aroound Rs. 700, an increase of 51.8% from the 2019–20 budget. The increase was supposedly to fund the various socio-economic welfare schemes in the city. The key revenue sources for BMC are: Holding Taxes, tax from advertisements, rent from municipal properties such as markets, shopping complexes, and kalyan mandaps (marriage halls), fees and user charges, and grants from state and central governments.

Lok Sabha and Vidhan Sabha Constituencies 
Citizens of Bhubaneswar elect one representative to India's lower house, the Lok Sabha, and three representatives to the state legislative assembly, through the constituencies of Bhubaneswar North, Ekamra-Bhubaneswar, and Bhubaneswar Central. The last Lok Sabha election was in 2019, when Aparajita Sarangi from Bharatiya Janata Party won the seat. The last state assembly election took place in 2019 as well, when all three Vidhan Sabha seats in Bhubaneswar were won by Biju Janata Dal: Susant Kumar Rout from North, Ashok Chandra Panda from Ekamra, and Ananta Narayan Jena from Central.

Judicial and Police Institutions 
As the seat of the Government of Odisha, Bhubaneswar is home to the Odisha Legislative Assembly and the state secretariat. Bhubaneswar has lower courts: the Court of Small Causes and the District Civil Court decide civil matters; the Sessions Court rules in criminal cases. The Bhubaneswar–Cuttack Police Commissionerate, established in 2008, is a city police force with primary responsibilities in law enforcement and investigation in the Bhubaneswar-Cuttack area. Shri S.K. Priyadarshi, IPS is the police commissioner.

Public utilities 
Electricity is supplied by the state-operated Central Electricity Supply Utility of Odisha.  TATA Power as a private entity started Power distribution in the city by the end of 2020. Fire services are handled by the state agency Odisha Fire Service. Drinking water is sourced from the Mahanadi, Kuakhai and Daya rivers. Water supply and sewerage are handled by the Public Health Engineering Organisation. As of 2015, 35% of the city was covered by piped water connections, 1.4% of the households had metered water connection, and the extent of non-revenue water in the city ran to 62.5%. The Engineering Department of BMC creates and maintains roads.

26.7% of the city is covered by sewage network, while more than 50% of the households are dependent on onsite containment systems, such as septic tanks. There is no sewage treatment plant in Bhubaneswar right now, but one is being built using JNNURM funds. The waste from the limited sewage network flows untreated into the Daya river. There is one septage treatment plant for fecal sludge with a capacity of 75 KLD.

The municipal corporation is responsible for the solid waste management in the city. The average municipal waste generated in the city is 480 kg/m3 for wet waste and 600 kg/m3 for wet waste. Bhubaneswar Municipal Corporation BMC has introduced door to door collection through battery operated garbage collection vehicle. It is trying to introduce segregation at source by providing two waste bins to every household, one each for dry and wet waste. Landfilling is the most common method of waste disposal in Bhubaneswar. State-owned Bharat Sanchar Nigam Limited, or BSNL, as well as private enterprises, among them Reliance Jio, Bharti Airtel, Vodafone Idea, are the leading telephone, cell phone and internet service providers in the city.

Education 

Bhubaneswar is a centre for higher education in the Eastern Region and is considered the education hub of Eastern India with several government and privately funded Universities and colleges. IIT Bhubaneswar, NISER Bhubaneswar, AIIMS Bhubaneswar and NIFT Bhubaneswar are some of the elite institutions of country which are located in the city. Utkal University Bhubaneswar is the oldest university in Odisha and the 17th oldest university in India.

Primary and secondary education 
Odia and English are the primary languages of instruction. Schools in Bhubaneswar follow the "10+2+3" plan for Regular Graduates and "10+2+4" plan for Technical studies. Schools in Bhubaneswar are either run by the state government or private organisations. Students typically enroll in schools that are affiliated with any of the following mediums of education.
 BSE, Odisha
 CHSE, Odisha
 CBSE
 Council for the Indian School Certificate Examinations
 SCTE&VT, Odisha

Notable union government schools in the city include
Kendriya Vidyalaya No. 1, Bhubaneswar,
Sainik School

Notable state government schools in the city include
Badagada Government High School, Bhubaneswar
Capital High School, Bhubaneswar
Government High School, Saheed Nagar

Notable private schools in the city include
DAV Public School, Unit-8, Bhubaneswar,
D.A.V. Public School, Chandrasekharpur,
Loyola School, Bhubaneswar,
Sai International School, Bhubaneswar,
St. Joseph's High School, Bhubaneswar,

Higher education 
Several colleges are affiliated with universities or institution based in Bhubaneswar or elsewhere in India. Most offer a wide range of programs in STEM and applied research and are rated highly by the Ministry of Human Resource Development, India.

Engineering and applied sciences institutions 
 C. V. Raman Global University
 Central Institute of Freshwater Aquaculture
 Eastern Academy of Science and Technology
 Indian Institute of Technology Bhubaneswar
 Institute of Chemical Technology, Mumbai (off campus in collaboration with IndianOil and IIT Kharagpur)
 Institute of Minerals and Materials Technology (IMMT, erstwhile RRL)
 Institute of Physics
 International Institute of Information Technology, Bhubaneswar (IIIT-BBSR or IIIT-BH)
 Kalinga Institute of Industrial Technology
 National Institute of Fashion Technology (NIFT)
 National Institute of Science Education and Research (NISER)
 Orissa Engineering College
 Regional Institute of Education

Medical institutions 
 All India Institute of Medical Sciences Bhubaneswar
 Hi-Tech Medical College & Hospital, Bhubaneswar
 Institute of Medical Sciences and Sum Hospital
 Kalinga Institute of Medical Sciences
 Regional Medical Research Center

Universities 
 Birla Global University, Bhubaneswar
 Centurion University of Technology and Management, Bhubaneswar
 Odisha University of Technology and Research
 International Institute of Information Technology, Bhubaneswar (IIIT-BBSR or IIIT-BH)
 Kalinga Institute of Industrial Technology
 Odisha State Open University
 Odisha University of Agriculture and Technology
 Rama Devi Women's University
 Regional College of Management
 Siksha 'O' Anusandhan
 Utkal University of Culture
 Utkal University
 Xavier University
Professional Institute

 The Institute of Cost Accountants of India -Bhubaneswar Chapter, Bhubaneswar.
The Institute of Chartered Accountants of India-Bhuneshwar Branch of EIRC

Think tanks / Research institutes 
 Nabakrushna Choudhury Centre for Development Studies (NCDS)

Tourism education is another field of study emerging. The Eastern Regional Centre of Indian Institute of Tourism and Travel Management (IITTM), the second in the country after Gwalior, was established in 1996. One IATA Authorised Training Centre (ATC) is also located in the city premises. Several regional management educational institutions also have travel and tourism related courses in their curriculum.

Transport

Bicycle 
A public bicycle sharing project named Mo Cycle has been started by the Bhubaneswar Smart City Limited (BSCL) and the Capital Region Urban Transport (CRUT). The scheme aims to reduce traffic congestion, promote non-motorized transport in the city and ensure better last mile connectivity. Chief minister Naveen Patnaik in November 2011 inaugurated Mo Cycle.
Around 400 cycle stands have been set up across the city. Around 2,000 bicycles have been ordered from three companies – Hexi, Yaana and Yulu. Hexi (from Hero Cycles) will provide 1,000 bicycles and Yaana and Yulu will provide 500 each. The availability of rentals Bicycles are accessed by the Dedicated mobile app – "mo app".

Bus 

Internal public transport is maintained by "Mo Bus (My Bus)" service administrated by CRUT(Capital Region Urban Transport) along with connecting nearest cities like Cuttack and Puri.

The headquarters of the Odisha State Road Transport Corporation (OSRTC) is in Bhubaneswar. The main Bhubaneswar inter-state bus terminus is at Barmunda,  from the city centre, from where OSRTC and private operators run buses connecting Bhubaneswar to cities in Odisha and with the neighbouring states of Andhra Pradesh, Jharkhand, West Bengal and Chhattisgarh. Bhubaneswar is connected to the rest of Odisha and India by National Highway-NH 16, which is a part of the Kolkata-Chennai prong of the Golden Quadrilateral, NH 203, State Highway 13 (Odisha) and State Highway 27 (Odisha). Asian Highway- AH 45 passes through the city.

Road 

Bhubaneswar has roads in grid form in the central city. Baramunda Inter State Bus Terminus (ISBT) is the major bus terminus in the city from where buses ply to all the districts in Odisha as well as to neighbouring state's cities like Hyderabad, Kolkata, Visakhapatnam, Raipur and Ranchi. City bus service (Mo Bus) runs across Bhubaneswar by Capital Region Urban Transport Authority run by Bhubaneswar Development Authority . A fleet of 300+ buses cover all major destinations including Cuttack, Puri and Khordha. Auto rickshaws are available for hire and on a share basis throughout the city. In parts of the city, cycle rickshaws offer short trips. To ease traffic jams, over-bridges at major road junctions and expansion of roads are under construction. In a study of six cities in India, Bhubaneswar was ranked third concerning pedestrian infrastructure. The city scored 50 points out of a maximum of 100.

Railway Station 

Bhubaneswar has the following stations:

The East Coast Railway has its headquarters in Bhubaneswar. Bhubaneswar railway station is one of the main stations of the Indian railway network. It is connected to major cities by daily express and passenger trains and daily service to all metro cities is available from here. However, the station is overloaded by existing traffic. Currently, the station has six platforms. There are plans to add two more platforms.

A satellite station New Bhubaneswar railway station is opened near Barang in July 2018 to decongest the existing installation.

Airport 

There are daily domestic flights from Bhubaneswar to Delhi, Hyderabad, Mumbai, Kolkata, Vishakhapatnam, Chennai and Bangalore.The major carriers from Bhubaneswar are Indigo, Vistara, AirAsia Berhad, AirAsia India and Air India. In March 2013, a new domestic terminal with a capacity of handling 30 million passengers per year was inaugurated to handle increased air traffic. On 10 July 2015, the first international flight took off from terminal 2 of Biju Patnaik International Airport.

Culture 

Bhubaneswar is supposed to have had over one thousand temples, earning the tag of the 'Temple City of India'. Temples are made in the Kalinga architectural style with a pine spire that curves up to a point over the sanctum housing the presiding deity and a pyramid-covered hall where people sit and pray.

Famous temples include Lingaraja Temple, Muktesvara Temple, Rajarani Temple, Ananta Vasudeva Temple. The Kukutesvara Siva Temple is a small, 1000-year-old shrine to Shiva.

The twin hills of Khandagiri and Udayagiri, served as the site of an ancient Jaina monastery which was carved into cave-like chambers in the face of the hill. These caves, with artistic carvings, date back to the 2nd century BCE. Dhauli hills has major edicts of Ashoka engraved on a mass of rock and a white Peace Pagoda was built by the Japan Buddha Sangha and the Kalinga Nippon Buddha Sangha in the 1970s. Apart from the ancient temples, other important temples were built in recent times include Ram Mandir and ISKCON.

Bhubaneswar along with Cuttack is the home of the Odia cinema industry, dubbed "Ollywood", where most of the state's film studios are situated.

Odia culture survives in the form of Classical Odissi dance, handicrafts, sand artistry and sculpturing as well as theatre and music. Boundary walls and gardens are increasingly being redone to depict the folk art of the state. Odissi, the oldest of the eight surviving classical dance forms of India can be traced from archaeological evidence from the temples in Bhubaneswar.

Odissi dance 
Odissi dance is generally accompanied by Odissi music. Srjan, the Odissi dance academy founded by Guru Kelucharan Mohapatra, the legendary Odissi dancer is found here. The Rabindra Mandapa in central Bhubaneswar plays host to cultural engagements, theatre and private functions.

Dress and attire 
Though Odia women traditionally wear the sari, shalwar kameez and of late, Western attire is gaining acceptance among younger women. Western-style dress has greater acceptance among men, although the traditional dhoti and kurta are seen during festivals.

The Odisha State Museum offers archaeological artefacts, weapons, local arts and crafts as well as insights into Odisha's natural and indigenous history. The Tribal Research Institute Museum hosts authentic tribal dwellings created by tribal craftsmen. Nandankanan Zoological Park, located on the northern outskirt of the city, is India's first zoo to join World Association of Zoos and Aquariums. The State Botanical Garden (Odisha) and Regional Plant Resource Center, popularly known as Ekamra Kanan, a park and botanical garden, has a large collection of exotic and regional fauna. The Ekamra Haat is a hand-loom and handicrafts market. Nicco Park and Ocean World are amusement parks. Other museums include Pathani Samanta Planetarium, Regional Museum of Natural History, Regional Science Center and State Handicrafts Museum.

Festivals 

On the day of Ashokashtami in the month of March or April, the image of Lingaraja (Shiva) and other deities are taken in a procession from Lingaraja Temple to the Mausima Temple, where the deities remain for four days. Hundreds of devotees participate in pulling the temple car that carries the deities, known as Rukuna Ratha. Ratha-Yatra, "Temple Car Festival," is the most important festival in Odisha and Bhubaneswar. The festival commemorates Jagannatha, who is said to have been the incarnation of India's revered deities, Vishnu and Krishna. Durga Puja, held in September–October, is an occasion for glamorous celebrations.

As a part of the Ekamra Festival, many cultural sub-festivals take place in January in Bhubaneswar which include Kalinga Mahotsaba (for traditional martial arts), Dhauli-Kalinga Mahotsaba (for classical dance forms), Rajarani Music Festival (for classical music) and Mukteswara Dance Festival (for Odishi dance). Residents engage in khattis, or leisurely chats, that often take the form of freestyle intellectual conversation.

Other festivals celebrated include Shivaratri, Diwali, Ganesha Chaturthi, Nuakhai and Saraswati Puja. Eid and Christmas are celebrated by the religious minorities in the city.

The Adivasi Mela, held in January, is a fair that displays the art, artefacts, tradition, culture, and music of the tribal inhabitants of Odisha. The Toshali National Crafts Mela, held in December, showcases handicrafts from all over India and from foreign countries. Other important fairs in the city include the Rajdhani Book Fair, Dot Fest and Khandagiri Utsav. Two international literary festivals are held in the city, Kalinga Literary Festival and Mystic Kalinga Festival. In modern times Bhubaneswar hosts a literary festival, the Odisha Literary Fest.

Cuisine 

Key elements of the city's cuisine include rice and a fish curry known as Machha Jhola, which can be accompanied by desserts such as Rasagola, Rasabali, Chhena Gaja, Chhena Jhilli and Chhena Poda. Odisha's large repertoire of seafood dishes includes various preparations of lobsters and crabs brought in from Chilika Lake.

Street foods such as gupchup (a deep-fried crêpe, stuffed with a mix of mashed potatoes and boiled yellow peas, and dipped in tamarind-infused water), cuttack-chaat, dahibara aloo dum (a deep-fried doughnut-shaped lentil dumpling marinated in yogurt-infused water and served alongside potato curry) and bara-ghuguni are sold all over the city. Traditional Oriya food such as dahi-pakhala (rice soaked in water with yogurt and seasonings) which is considered as a body coolant, accompanied by badi chura or saga are consumed during the months of April–June.

The abadha of Lingaraja Temple and Ananta Vasudeva Temple served for devotees is considered a vegetarian culinary delight. Other vegetarian dishes are Dalma (made of lentils and vegetables boiled together and then fried with other spices) and Santula (lightly spiced steamed vegetables).

Sports 

Bhubaneswar's major sporting arena is the Kalinga Stadium, having facilities for athletics, football, hockey, basketball, tennis, table tennis and swimming. It is known for hosting the Odisha Hockey World Cup in November–December 2018. Kalinga Lancers, the sixth franchise of Hockey India League and Odisha FC, a club of Indian Super League, are based in Bhubaneswar with Kalinga Stadium as their home ground. East Coast Railway Stadium, a prominent cricket stadium hosts Ranji Trophy and other matches.

Odisha Naval Tata Hockey High Performance Centre, a hockey academy for sub-junior and junior category, has also been set up at Kalinga Stadium after Government of Odisha, Tata Steel & Tata Trusts (Hockey Ace foundation) joined hands to initiate a three-pronged program under the HPC banner of Government of Odisha.

The construction of a gallery and stadium renovation is under way. An air-conditioned indoor stadium, with a capacity of 2000 spectators for badminton, volleyball, basketball and table tennis games is also being constructed. Bhubaneswar has a franchise of Odisha Premier League, Bhubaneswar Jaguars, which started in 2010. Bhubaneswar Golf Club, a nine-hole golf course is situated in Infocity.

The Kalinga Institute of Industrial Technology Stadium commonly KIIT Stadium is a new multipurpose stadium located as a part of Kalinga Institute of Industrial Technology University Campus or KIIT University in Bhubaneswar with a capacity of 40,000 currently.

The 2017 Asian Athletics Championships was the 22nd edition of the Asian Athletics Championships. It was held from 6–9 July 2017 at the Kalinga Stadium. Bhubaneswar is the third Indian city to host the Asian Athletics Championships, with Delhi being the first, in 1989, and Pune, the second, in 2013.

Bhubaneswar is emerging as the new sports capital of India, as the FIH and the IOA president, Narindar Batra, recently stated in a ceremony, while unveiling the new logo for the Indian hockey team jersey, which is sponsored by the government of Odisha. The state, Batra mentioned, provides equal importance and opportunity for all sports such as cricket, football, field hockey, tennis, badminton, chess and many more.

Media 
The city's widely circulated Odia-language newspapers are Sambad, Dharitri, Pragatibadi, Samaja, News 7, Argus, Khabara, Orissa Bhaskara, Prameya and Samaya. Orissa Post and Odia Age are the English-language newspaper that is produced and published from Bhubaneswar. Other popular English-language newspapers published and sold in Bhubaneswar include The Times of India, The Statesman, Hindustan Times, The Hindu, The Indian Express and the Asian Age. Bhubaneswar has substantial circulation of financial dailies, including The Economic Times, The Financial Express, Business Line and Business Standard. Vernacular newspapers, such as those in the Hindi, Bengali and Telugu languages are read by minorities. Major periodicals based in Bhubaneswar include Saptahika Samaya, Saptahika Samaja and Kadambini.

All India Radio, the national state-owned radio broadcaster, airs several AM channels from the radio station located in Cuttack. Bhubaneswar has five local radio stations broadcasting on FM, including two from AIR. India's state-owned television broadcaster Doordarshan Odia provides two free-to-air terrestrial channels, while a mix of Odia, Hindi, English and other regional channels are accessible via cable subscription and direct-broadcast satellite services. Some of the Odia language television channels are Sidarth TV, Manjari, Colors Odia, Sarthak TV and Tarang TV. Odia-language 24-hour television news channels include News 7, Argus, Odisha TV, Kanak TV, ETV News Odia, MBC TV and Naxatra News.

Notable people 

The following are some of the notable people associated (i.e. either born or spent a significant part of their life) with Bhubaneswar:

 Subroto Bagchi
 Ranjib Biswal
 Dutee Chand
 Nabakrushna Choudhuri
 Ileana Citaristi
 Bidhu Bhusan Das
 Prabhat Nalini Das
 Pankaj Charan Das
 J. B. S. Haldane
 Baidyanath Misra
 B. K. Misra
 Bhubaneswar Mishra
 Bijay Mohanty
 Debashish Mohanty
 Gopinath Mohanty
 Saraju Mohanty
 Uttam Mohanty
 Bibhu Mohapatra
 Kelucharan Mohapatra
 Mira Nair
 Oopali Operajita
 Sanjukta Panigrahi
 Ramesh Chandra Parida
 Prasanna Kumar Patasani
 Biju Patnaik
 Janaki Ballabh Patnaik
 Naveen Patnaik
 Sudarsan Pattnaik
 Rakesh Pradhan
 Trilochan Pradhan
 Biswa Kalyan Rath
 Mahasweta Ray
 Tandra Ray
 Archita Sahu
 Salabega
 Achyuta Samanta
 Pathani Samanta
 Helen Spurway
 Mayadhar Swain

Sister cities 
  Cupertino, California, United States
 Bloemfontein, South Africa

See also 
 Bhubaneswar ITIR
 Chari Kshetra
 Ghanteswara Siva Temple
 List of neighbourhoods in Bhubaneswar
 List of parks in Bhubaneswar
 List of temples in Bhubaneswar
 List of twin towns and sister cities in India
 Markandeshwar Siva Temple
 Nandankanan Zoological Park
 Sahadevesvara Siva Temple
 Sankarananda Matha

References

External links 

 
  
 
 Ekamra Kshetra – The Temple City, Bhubaneswar, UNESCO World Heritage Centre

 
Smart cities in India
Planned cities in India
Cities and towns in Khordha district
Populated places established in 1948